Shorea fallax is a tree in the family Dipterocarpaceae, native to Borneo. The specific epithet fallax means "deceptive" and refers to the species initially being considered to be Shorea scaberrima.

Description
The brown bark is flaky and cracked.

Distribution and habitat
Shorea fallax is endemic to Borneo.

Conservation
Shorea fallax has been assessed as least concern on the IUCN Red List. However, in Kalimantan it is threatened by conversion of land and by logging for its timber. The species does occur in a number of protected areas in Sabah and Sarawak.

References

fallax
Endemic flora of Borneo
Plants described in 1963